Sheila Reid  (born August 2, 1989) is a Canadian track and field athlete who competes in cross country, middle and long-distance running events.   She competed collegiately at Villanova University.  Reid won the 2010 and 2011 NCAA Women's Cross Country Championship, and in June 2011 became the first woman to win the 5000 m and the 1500 m at the NCAA Women's Outdoor Track and Field Championship. She won the Honda Sports Award as the nation's top female cross country runner in 2011, repeated as the best female cross country runner in 2012, and also won the Honda Sports Award for Track and field in 2012.

She competed in the 5000 m in Athletics at the 2012 Summer Olympics, and in the 1500 m at the 2013 World Championships in Athletics. Early in her professional career she worked as a volunteer assistant at Villanova University, and then went on to join Oregon Track Club Elite in May 2014.

Running career

Professional

2012
In July 2012, Reid was named to the 2012 Canadian Summer Olympic Team. She competed in the 5000 m race, in which she placed 15th in her heat and 28th overall in the qualification heats.

2013
In 2013, she competed in the 1500 m at the 2013 World Championships in Athletics, falling a bit short of her expectations.

2017
On May 18, 2017, after being injured for some time, Reid made an astonishing comeback in the 1500m establishing a World Championships qualifying time of 4:07.07 while placing first at the USATF Distance Classic in San Francisco, CA. Prelude to her 2017 milestone qualification was her 4:10.40 winning performance at the Oregon Twilight on May 5. Continuing on a solid trajectory for the year, Reid placed second in 4:12.91 at the 2017 Canadian Track and Field Championships to qualify for the 2017 World Championships in London. At the 2017 World Championships in London on August 4, Reid was unable to advance to the 1500 m semi-finals after placing 12th in the preliminary heats in a time of 4:13.12.

Personal Bests

Overall

2013 Best Achievements

2015 Best Achievements

2016 Best Achievements

References

External links
 
 
 
 
 

1989 births
Living people
Athletes from Toronto
Canadian female long-distance runners
Canadian female middle-distance runners
Olympic track and field athletes of Canada
Athletes (track and field) at the 2012 Summer Olympics
World Athletics Championships athletes for Canada
Villanova Wildcats women's cross country runners
Villanova Wildcats women's track and field athletes